Celtic is a camogie club, winner of the Dublin Championship on 12 occasions and the inaugural winner of the All-Ireland Senior Club Camogie Championship in 1964.. Dublin did not send a representative in 1965, so they did not defend their title.

Grounds
The Celtic camogie club was formed in the Coolock area of Dublin by the Keegan sisters in 1929.
Una O’Connor, Eileen Duffy, Ally Hussey, Betty Hughes, Eithne Leech, Kit Kehoe, Kitty Murphy, Deirdre Lane, Una Crowley and Ann Colgan are a sprinkling of the stars that won many Dublin championship medals with Celtic.

All Ireland champions
Celtic won ten Dublin championships in their heyday and were the first All Ireland club champions when the competition was introduced in 1964 thanks to a great display by Alice Hussey at centre back and three goals from Úna O'Connor.

1964 champions
On their 1964 All Ireland side Angela Gill was a daughter of Mick Gill who won All-Ireland hurling medals with Galway and Dublin, Mary Casey was a sister of Bill Casey, who had won an All-Ireland football medal with Dublin in 1963 and Claire Heffernan was a sister of Dublin footballer and later manager, Kevin Heffernan.

Notable players
Noted alumni include six presidents of the Camogie Association Eilish Redmond, Mary Lynch, Nell McCarthy, Mary Moran, Mary Fennelly and Liz Howard. 
Camogie Team of the Century member Kathleen Duffy recalled in 2004 cycling to Coolock to training, "sometimes pulling the lawnmower behind us all the way because we used to cut it ourselves. Those were different days, we cycled everywhere and actually got great coverage in the papers. People would recognise you around town and shout over 'well done yesterday, Eileen!'" Notable players included Eileen Duffy, Kit Kehoe, Kitty Murphy, Mary Moran (later to become a President of the Camogie Association), Mary Fennelly and Brid Fennelly.

Colours
Celtic wore a navy gym tunic with a red bar around the skirt and a white blouse.

References

External links
 Camogie.ie Official Camogie Association Website
 Wikipedia List of Camogie clubs

Gaelic games clubs in Dublin (city)
Camogie clubs in County Dublin